Wilhelm Rønning (10 November 1895 – 7 September 1983) was a Norwegian footballer. He played in two matches for the Norway national football team in 1915 to 1917.

References

External links
 

1895 births
1983 deaths
Norwegian footballers
Norway international footballers
Place of birth missing
Association footballers not categorized by position